Ernst Rau (4 January 1927 – 2 May 2012) was a German fencer who competed for Saar at the 1952 Summer Olympics. He fenced in the individual and team foil and sabre events.

See also
 Saar at the 1952 Summer Olympics

References

1927 births
2012 deaths
German male fencers
Olympic fencers of Saar
Fencers at the 1952 Summer Olympics